Rhinogobius mizunoi is a species of fish in the in the family Oxudercidae. 
It is found in a freshwater stream in Shizuoka Prefecture, Japan.

Size

Etymology
The fish is named in honor of Nobuhiko Mizuno, former professor of Ehime University (Japan), for his contribution to the knowledge of the ecology of freshwater fishes in Japan, particularly gobies of the Rhinogobius species.

References

mizunoi
Freshwater fish of Japan
Endemic fauna of Japan
Taxa named by Toshiyuki Suzuki
Taxa named by Koichi Shibukawa
Taxa named by Masahiro Aizawa
Fish described in 2017